is a Japanese television jidaigeki or period drama that was broadcast in 1983. It is the 20th in the Hissatsu series. Atsushi Watanabe appeared in the Hissatsu series twice in past but in the drama he played professional killer for the first time.

Cast
 Masatoshi Nakamura: Sota
 Mieko Takamine: Narutaki Shinobu
 Atsushi Watanabe: Daikichi
 Midori Nishizaki : Osawa
 Naomi Fujiyama : Onao

References

1983 Japanese television series debuts
1980s drama television series
Jidaigeki television series